On 15 March 2019, two consecutive mass shootings occurred in a terrorist attack on two mosques in Christchurch, New Zealand. The attacks, carried out by a lone gunman who entered both mosques during Friday prayer, began at the Al Noor Mosque in the suburb of Riccarton at 1:40 pm and continued at the Linwood Islamic Centre at 1:52 pm. 51 people were killed and 40 were injured. 

The gunman, 28-year-old Brenton Harrison Tarrant from Grafton, New South Wales, Australia, was arrested after his vehicle was rammed by a police unit as he was driving to a third mosque in Ashburton. He was described in media reports as a white supremacist. He had live-streamed the first shooting on Facebook, and prior to the attack, had published an online manifesto; both the video and manifesto were subsequently banned in New Zealand and Australia. On 26 March 2020, he pleaded guilty to 51 murders, 40 attempted murders, and engaging in a terrorist act, and in August was sentenced to life imprisonment without the possibility of parolethe first such sentence in New Zealand.

The attack was linked to an increase in white supremacy and alt-right extremism globally observed since about 2015. Politicians and world leaders condemned it, and Prime Minister Jacinda Ardern described it as "one of New Zealand's darkest days". The government established a royal commission into its security agencies in the wake of the shootings, which were the deadliest in modern New Zealand history and the worst ever committed by an Australian national. The commission submitted its report to the government on 26 November 2020, the details of which were made public on 7 December.

Background 

New Zealand has been considered a safe and tolerant place with low levels of gun violence and was named the second-most peaceful country in the world by Global Peace Index in 2019, the year of the attacks. This attack was the first mass shooting in the country since the Raurimu massacre in 1997; prior to that, the deadliest public mass shooting was the 1990 Aramoana massacre, in which 13 people died. While New Zealand has rarely been associated with far-right extremism, experts have suggested it has been growing there. Sociologist Paul Spoonley called Christchurch a hotbed for white supremacists and the extreme nationalist movement, a suggestion rejected by Christchurch-based MP Gerry Brownlee. Australia, where the gunman, Brenton Tarrant, was from, has also seen an increase in xenophobia, racism, and Islamophobia.

In the 2018 census, some 57,000 New Zealand residents (1.2% of the population) reported their religion as Islam.
The Al Noor Mosque, the first mosque in the South Island, opened in 1985. The Linwood Islamic Centre opened in early 2018.

Events

Al Noor Mosque
On 15 March 2019, at 1:40 pm, Tarrant entered the Al Noor Mosque in Riccarton and began shooting.
Approximately 190 people, mostly men, were attending Friday prayer at the time.

Tarrant live-streamed for 17 minutes (before and during the first shooting, and between the two shootings) on Facebook Live, starting with the drive to the Al Noor mosque and ending as he drove away. Just before the shooting, he played several songs, including "Remove Kebab", a Serb nationalist and anti-Muslim song; and "The British Grenadiers", a traditional British military marching song. During the shooting, he continued to play "military music" from a portable speaker attached to a tactical vest he was wearing.

As Tarrant approached the mosque, a worshipper greeted him with "Hello, brother". Tarrant fired a Mossberg 930 semiautomatic shotgun nine times towards the front entrance from outside, killing the worshipper. He then dropped the shotgun and opened fire on people inside with an AR-15 style rifle, killing three other men near the entrance and dozens more inside a prayer hall; a strobe light attached to one of his weapons disoriented victims. Another worshipper charged at Tarrant but was shot and fatally wounded. This worshipper, Naeem Rashid, was posthumously awarded the Nishan-e-Shujaat and the New Zealand Cross, the highest awards of bravery in Pakistan and New Zealand respectively.

Tarrant fired at worshippers in the prayer hall from close range, shooting many multiple times. He then went outside, where he killed another man and retrieved another weapon from his car, before going to the mosque's car park and shooting several people there. He reentered the mosque and fired on already-wounded people in the prayer hall, then again went outside, where he killed a woman. He drove off about five minutes after arriving at the mosque, firing at people and cars through the windscreen and closed window of his own car. He said, on the livestream, that he had planned to set the mosque on fire; four modified petrol containers were later found in his car.

Police arrived just as Tarrant was leaving, but his car was hidden by a bus. At 1:51 pm, the livestream ended, but the GoPro device attached to Tarrant's helmet continued recording until he was apprehended by police eight minutes later.

Linwood Islamic Centre 

At 1:52 pm, Tarrant arrived at the Linwood Islamic Centre,
 east of the Al Noor Mosque, where about 100 people were inside. Tarrant parked his vehicle on the mosque's driveway, preventing other cars from entering or leaving. According to a witness, Tarrant was initially unable to find the mosque's main door, instead shooting people outside and through a window, killing four and alerting those inside.

A worshipper named Abdul Aziz Wahabzada ran outside and, as Tarrant was retrieving another gun from his car, threw a payment terminal at Tarrant. Tarrant fired at Aziz, who picked up an empty shotgun Tarrant had dropped, took cover among nearby cars, and attempted to draw Tarrant's attention by shouting, "I'm here!" Regardless, Tarrant entered the mosque, where he shot and killed three people. When Tarrant returned to his car, Aziz threw the shotgun at it. Tarrant drove away at 1:55 pm. Aziz was awarded the New Zealand Cross, New Zealand's highest award for bravery.

Tarrant's arrest 
A silver 2005 Subaru Outback matching the description of Tarrant's vehicle was seen by a police unit, and a pursuit was initiated at 1:57 pm. Two police officers rammed his car with their vehicle, and Tarrant was arrested on Brougham Street in Sydenham at 1:59 pm, 18 minutes after the first emergency call.

Victims

Forty-four people were killed at the Al Noor Mosque and seven at the Linwood Islamic Centre; almost all were male. Their ages ranged from three to 77 years old. Thirty-five others were injured at the Al Noor Mosque and five at Linwood.

Perpetrator 
Brenton Harrison Tarrant, a white Australian man, born in October, 1990, was 28 years old at the time of the shootings. He grew up in Grafton, New South Wales, where he attended Grafton High School. After Tarrant's parents separated when he was young, his mother's subsequent boyfriend abused her and the children. He worked as a personal trainer in his hometown from 2009 to 2011, quitting after an injury; in that time, he inherited  from his father, who committed suicide in 2010.

At the time of the shootings, Tarrant had been living in Andersons Bay in Dunedin since 2017. He was a member of a South Otago gun club, where he practised shooting at its range. A neighbour described him as a friendly loner. In 2018, Tarrant was treated for eye and thigh injuries at Dunedin Hospital; he told doctors he had sustained the injuries while trying to dislodge an improperly chambered bullet from a gun. The doctors also treated him for steroid abuse, but never reported Tarrant's visit to the authorities, which would have resulted in police reassessing his fitness to hold a gun licence.

Travels and racist views 
Tarrant began expressing racist ideas from a young age. From 2012 onward, he visited a number of countries in Asia and Europe, using the money he inherited from his father. He always travelled alone, with the exception of a trip to North Korea. Police in Bulgaria and Turkey investigated Tarrant's visits to their countries. Security officials suspected that he had come into contact with far-right organisations about two years before the shooting, while visiting European nations. He donated €1,500 to Identitäre Bewegung Österreich (IBÖ), the Austrian branch of Generation Identity (part of the Identitarian movement) in Europe, as well as €2,200 to Génération Identitaire, the French branch of the group, and interacted with IBÖ leader Martin Sellner via email between January 2018 and July 2018, offering to meet in Vienna and a linking to his YouTube channel. During the planning stages of his attack he made a donation of $106.68 to Rebel Media, a site that featured both Sellner and several articles espousing "white genocide" and "Great Replacement" conspiracy theories.

Captivated with sites of battles between Christian European nations and the Ottoman Empire, Tarrant went on another series of visits to the Balkans from 2016 to 2018, with Croatia, Bulgaria, Romania, Hungary, Turkey, and Bosnia-Herzegovina confirming his presence there in these years. He posted Balkan nationalist material on social media platforms and called for the United States to be weakened in order to prevent what he perceived as NATO intervention in support of Muslims (Albanians) against Christians (Serbs). He said he was against intervention by NATO because he saw the Serbian military as "Christian Europeans attempting to remove these Islamic occupiers from Europe". By June 2016, relatives noted a change in Tarrant's personality, which he claimed was the result of a mugging incident in Ethiopia, and his mother had expressed concern for his mental health.

In 2016, three years prior to the attacks, Tarrant praised Blair Cottrell as a leader of the far-right movements in Australia and made more than 30 comments on the now-deleted "United Patriots Front" and "True Blue Crew" webpages. An Australian Broadcasting Corporation team who studied the comments called them "fragments and digital impressions of a well-travelled young man who frequented hate-filled anonymous messaging boards and was deeply engaged in a global alt-right culture." A Melbourne man said that in 2016, he filed a police complaint after Tarrant allegedly told him in an online conversation, "I hope one day you meet the rope". He said that the police told him to block Tarrant and did not take a statement from him. The police said that they were unable to locate a complaint.

After his arrest, Tarrant told investigators that he frequented right-wing discussion boards on 4chan and 8chan and also found YouTube to be "a significant source of information and inspiration."

Weapons 

Police recovered six guns: two AR-15 style rifles (one manufactured by Windham Weaponry and the other by Ruger), two 12-gauge shotguns (a semiautomatic Mossberg 930 and a pump-action Ranger 870), and two other rifles (a .357 Magnum Uberti lever-action rifle, and a .223-caliber Mossberg Predator bolt-action rifle). They were all purchased between December 2017 and March 2019, along with more than 7,000 rounds of ammunition. Tarrant held a firearms licence with an "A" endorsement, and he started buying his arsenal a month after acquiring his licence. According to a city gun store, Tarrant bought four firearms and ammunition online. The shop said none of the four were military-style weapons, and it is not known if these guns were the ones used in the attacks. The shop did not detect anything unusual or extraordinary about the customer. Additionally, he illegally replaced the semi-automatic rifles' small, legal magazines with 30-round magazines purchased online, and the triggers of some of the firearms were modified so he could fire them more quickly.

According to Stuff, Tarrant was wrongly granted a firearms licence due to police failures. Sources said that police failed to interview a family member as required for obtaining a firearms licence, instead interviewing two men that Tarrant had met through an online chatroom. In the days after the attacks, the police had quashed concerns that Tarrant had obtained the weapons inappropriately. Police have not given comment to this allegation, saying they do not wish to interfere with the ongoing inquiry into the event at the time.

The guns and magazines used were covered in white writing naming historical events, people, and motifs related to historical conflicts, wars, and battles between Muslims and European Christians; as well as the names of recent Islamic terrorist attack victims and the names of far-right attackers such as Alexandre Bissonnette, Darren Osbourne and Luca Traini. The markings also included references to "Turkofagos" (Turk eater), a term used by Greeks during the Greek War of Independence and white supremacist slogans such as the anti-Muslim phrase "Remove Kebab" that originated from Serbia and the Fourteen Words. The Archangel Michael's Cross of the Romanian fascist organization Iron Guard was among the symbols on the firearm. Apart from the Latin alphabet, writings on the weaponry were in the Cyrillic, Armenian and Georgian alphabets. The writings were names dedicated to historic individuals that fought against Muslim forces. On his pack was a Black Sun patch, and two dog tags: one with a Celtic cross, and one with a Slavic swastika design.

Police also found two improvised explosive devices attached to a car; these were defused by the New Zealand Defence Force. No explosives were found on the gunman.

Manifesto 
Tarrant claims to be the author of a 74-page manifesto titled The Great Replacement, a reference to the "Great Replacement" and "white genocide" conspiracy theories. It said that the attacks were planned two years prior, and the location was selected three months prior. Minutes before the attacks began, the manifesto was emailed to more than 30 recipients, including the prime minister's office and several media outlets, and links were shared on Twitter and 8chan.

In the manifesto, several anti-immigrant sentiments are expressed, including hate speech against migrants, white supremacist rhetoric, and calls for all non-European immigrants in Europe who he claimed to be "invading his land" to be removed. The manifesto displays neo-Nazi symbols such as the Black Sun and the Odin's cross. The author denies being a Nazi, describing himself instead as an "ethno-nationalist", an "eco-fascist", and a "kebab removalist", in reference to a meme exalting the genocide of Bosnian Muslims that occurred during the Bosnian War. The author cites Norwegian terrorist Anders Behring Breivik, Dylann Roof and others as an inspiration. The author said that he agrees with British Union of Fascists leader Oswald Mosley and that the People's Republic of China was the nation closest to his ideology. Despite claiming to launch this attack in the name of diversity, he called for the expulsion of people he deemed to be "invaders" from Europe including but not limited to Roma, Africans, Indians, Turks and Semitic peoples. The author says he originally targeted the Al Huda Mosque in Dunedin but changed his mind after visiting Christchurch, because the mosques there contained "more adults and a prior history of extremism". In 2014 and 2015, local press had reported an allegation that a congregation member had been radicalised at the mosque. Additionally, the shooter also called for the killing of German Chancellor Angela Merkel, Turkish President Recep Tayyip Erdoğan and London Mayor Sadiq Khan.

The manifesto was described by some media outlets as "shitposting"—trolling designed to engender conflict between certain groups and people. Readers of the manifesto described it as containing deliberately provocative and absurd statements, such as sarcastically claiming to have been turned into a killer by playing violent video games. On 23 March 2019, the manifesto was deemed "objectionable" by the Chief Censor of New Zealand, making it unlawful to possess or distribute it in New Zealand. Exemptions to the ban were available for journalists, researchers, and academics. In August 2019, The New Zealand Herald reported that printed copies of the manifesto were being sold online outside New Zealand, something New Zealand law could not prevent.

Genocide scholar A. Dirk Moses analysed the manifesto, concluding that "Tarrant's words yield insights into the subjectivity of genocidaires more generally, namely that they commit terrorist acts with genocidal intent as – in their own mind – preventative self-defence; not as acts of aggression but, as he writes, 'a partisan action against an occupying force. According to Moses, it was hypocritical for Tarrant to complain about supposed "white genocide" from immigration without recognising that he himself comes from a settler colony that resulted from genocide against Indigenous Australians.

In the manifesto, Tarrant said he hoped mass shootings would cause conflict over gun control in the United States, and potentially lead to civil war.

Preparation 

Tarrant is thought to have become obsessed with terrorist attacks committed by Islamic extremists in 2016 and 2017, started planning an attack about two years prior to the shootings, and chosen his targets three months in advance. Some survivors at the Al Noor Mosque believed they had seen Tarrant there on several Fridays before the attack, pretending to pray and asking about the mosque's schedules. The Royal Commission report found no evidence of this, and police instead believe that Tarrant had viewed an online tour of Al-Noor as part of his planning.

On 8 January 2019, Tarrant used a drone operated from a nearby park to investigate the mosque's grounds. Additionally, he used the Internet to find detailed mosque plans, interior pictures, and prayer schedules to figure out when mosques would be at their busiest levels. On the same day, he had driven past the Linwood Islamic Centre.

Legal proceedings

Arraignment 
Tarrant appeared in the Christchurch District Court on 16 March, where he was charged with one count of murder. The judge ordered the courtroom closed to the public except for accredited media and allowed the accused to be filmed and photographed on the condition that Tarrant's face be pixellated. In court, Tarrant smiled at reporters and made an inverted OK gesture below his waist, said to be a "white power" sign.

The case was transferred to the High Court, and Tarrant was remanded in custody as his lawyer did not seek bail. He was subsequently transferred to the country's only maximum-security unit at Auckland Prison. He lodged a formal complaint regarding his prison conditions, on the grounds that he has no access to newspapers, television, Internet, visitors, or phone calls. On 4 April, police announced they had increased the total number of charges to 89, 50 for murder and 39 for attempted murder, with other charges still under consideration. At the next hearing on 5 April, Tarrant was ordered by the judge to undergo a psychiatric assessment of his mental fitness to stand trial.

On 20 May, a new charge of engaging in a terrorist act was laid against Tarrant under the Terrorism Suppression Act 2002. One murder charge and one attempted murder charge were also added, bringing the total to 51 and 40, respectively.

Initial plea and pre-trial detention 
On 14 June 2019, Tarrant appeared at the Christchurch High Court via audio-visual link from Auckland Prison. Through his lawyer, he pleaded not guilty to one count of engaging in a terrorist act, 51 counts of murder, and 40 counts of attempted murder. Mental health assessments had indicated no issues regarding his fitness to plead or stand trial. The trial was originally set to begin on 4 May 2020, but it was later pushed back to 2 June 2020 to avoid coinciding with the Islamic holy month of Ramadan.

During his time in prison, Tarrant was able to send seven letters, one of which was subsequently posted on the Internet message boards 4chan and 8chan by a recipient. Minister of Corrections Kelvin Davis and the Department of Corrections were criticised for allowing the distribution of these letters. Prime Minister Ardern subsequently announced that the Government would explore amending the Corrections Act 2004 to further restrict what mail can be received and sent by prisoners.

Guilty plea and sentencing arrangements 
On 26 March 2020, Tarrant appeared at the Christchurch High Court via audio-visual link from Auckland Prison. During the appearance, he pleaded guilty to all 92 charges. Due to the nationwide COVID-19 pandemic lockdown, the general public was barred from the hearing. Reporters and representatives for the Al-Noor and Linwood mosques were present in the courtroom. According to media reports, Tarrant's lawyers had informed the courts that their client was considering changing his plea. On 25 March, Tarrant issued his lawyers with formal written instructions confirming that he wanted to change his pleas to guilty. In response, court authorities began making arrangements for the case to be called as soon as possible in the midst of the COVID-19 lockdown. The judge convicted Tarrant on all charges and remanded him in custody to await sentencing. For sentencing, Tarrant had dismissed his lawyers and represented himself during those proceedings.

On 10 July, the government announced that overseas-based victims of the shootings would receive border exemptions and financial help in order to fly to New Zealand for the sentencing. On 13 July, it was reported that Tarrant had dismissed his lawyers and would be representing himself during sentencing proceedings.

Sentencing 

Sentencing began on 24 August 2020 before Justice Cameron Mander at the Christchurch High Court, and it was televised. Tarrant did not oppose the sentence proposed and declined to address the court. The Crown prosecutors demonstrated to the court how Tarrant had meticulously planned the two shootings and more attacks, while numerous survivors and their relatives gave victim impact statements, which were covered by national and international media. Tarrant was then sentenced to life imprisonment without the possibility of parole for each of the 51 murders, and life imprisonment for engaging in a terrorist act and 40 attempted murders. The sentence is New Zealand's first terrorism conviction. It was also the first time that life imprisonment without parole, the maximum sentence available in New Zealand, had been imposed. Mander said Tarrant's crimes were "so wicked that even if you are detained until you die, it will not exhaust the requirements of punishment and denunciation."

Following the sentencing, Deputy Prime Minister Winston Peters called for Tarrant to serve his sentence in Australia in order to avoid New Zealand having to pay the costs for his life imprisonment. The cost of housing Tarrant in prison was estimated at 4,930 per day,
compared to an average cost of $338 per sentenced prisoner per day. Peters's remarks were also motivated by Australia's policy of deporting New Zealand citizens who had committed crimes or breached character requirements. Prime Minister Jacinda Ardern said there is currently no legal basis for the proposal and that respecting the wishes of his victims and their relatives would be paramount. Justice Minister Andrew Little said Parliament would need to pass a law to deport Tarrant to Australia. University of Otago law professor Dr Andrew Geddis said it was "legally impossible" to deport Tarrant to Australia to serve his sentence. On 28 August, Australian Prime Minister Scott Morrison and Australian Home Affairs Minister Peter Dutton advised that, while no formal request had been made by the New Zealand Government to repatriate Tarrant to Australia and for him to serve his life sentence in an Australian correctional facility, the Australian Government was open to considering a request.

Imprisonment
On 14 April 2021, Tarrant appealed against his prison conditions and his designation as a "terrorist entity" at the Auckland High Court. According to media reports, he is being imprisoned at a special "prison within a prison" known as a "Prisoners of Extreme Risk Unit" with two other inmates. Eighteen guards have been rostered to guard Tarrant, who is being housed in his own wing. On 24 April, Tarrant abandoned his appeal.

In early November 2021, Tarrant's new lawyer Dr Tony Ellis stated that his client intended to appeal against his sentence and conviction, claiming that his guilty plea had been obtained under duress and that his conditions while on remand breached the New Zealand Bill of Rights Act 1990. Mosque attack survivors have criticised Tarrant's appeal as a form of "grandstanding" and an attempt by the terrorist to "re-traumatise" the Muslim community.

In early November 2022, Tarrant appealed against his sentence and conviction at the Court of Appeal in Wellington. A Court of Appeal spokeswoman confirmed Tarrant's appeal and that no hearing date had been set. Mosque shooting survivors including Imam Gamal Fouda, Temel Atacocugu, and Rahimi Ahmad described Tarrant's appeal as "re-traumatising," insensitive and attention-seeking.

Aftermath

Governmental response 
Police advised mosques to close temporarily, and sent officers to secure and patrol various sites in Christchurch. All Air New Zealand Link services departing from Christchurch Airport were cancelled as a precaution, due to the absence of security screening at the regional terminal. Security was increased at Parliament, and public tours of the buildings were cancelled. In Dunedin, the Police Armed Offenders Squad searched a house, later reported to have been rented by Tarrant, and cordoned off part of the surrounding street in Andersons Bay because Tarrant had indicated on social media that he had originally planned to target the Al Huda Mosque in that city.

For the first time in New Zealand history, the terrorism threat level was raised to high. Prime Minister Ardern called the incident an "act of extreme and unprecedented violence" on "one of New Zealand's darkest days". She described it as a "well-planned" terrorist attack and said she would render the person accused of the attacks "nameless" while urging the public to speak the victims' names instead. Ardern directed that flags on public buildings be flown at half-mast.

In May 2019, the NZ Transport Agency offered to replace any vehicle number plates with the prefix "GUN" on request.

In mid-October 2019, Ardern awarded bravery awards to the two police officers who apprehended Tarrant at the annual Police Association Conference in Wellington. Due to the legal proceedings against Tarrant at the time, the two officers had interim name suppression, but in December 2019, this was lifted.

On 1 September 2020, Prime Minister Ardern designated Tarrant as a terrorist entity, thereby freezing his assets and making it a criminal offence for anyone to support him financially.

Media response 
For the three months following the shooting, almost 1,000 reports were published in major news outlets in New Zealand. Less than 10% of news reports published by major media outlets mentioned Tarrant's name. Susanna Every-Palmer, an academic psychiatrist, suggested that the media made a moral choice to deny Tarrant exposure and not sensationalise his views, deviating from how similar events internationally were covered in the media. The court required the media to pixelate Tarrant's face when covering the legal proceedings, thus, within New Zealand, he remained largely faceless and nameless. Instead, media coverage focused largely on the victims and their families.

In contrast, the media response in Australia was different, focusing on the extreme violence of the attack, as well as the attacker and his manifesto. For example, The Australian published an audio excerpt containing cries for help, and The Herald Sun wrote dramatic descriptions of victims being shot and used poetic devices to create more vivid imagery. Coverage of the victims was largely focused on physical horrors such as bloodshed, injuries, and graves being dug.

Other responses in New Zealand 

Within an hour of the attack, all schools in the city were placed in "lockdown". A ministry report launched after the attacks said schools' handling of the events were varied: some schoolchildren in lockdown still had their mobile phones, and some were able to view the footage of the first attack online, while some schools had children "commando crawl" to the bathroom under teacher supervision. Student climate strikers at the global School Strike for the Climate rally in Cathedral Square, near the sites of the attacks, were advised by police either to seek refuge in public buildings or go home. The citywide lockdown lasted nearly three hours.

In response to security concerns, the University of Otago postponed its sesquicentennial street parade which had been scheduled for 16 March.

The third test cricket match between New Zealand and Bangladesh, scheduled to commence at Hagley Oval in Hagley Park on 16 March, was likewise cancelled due to security concerns. The Bangladesh team were planning to attend Friday prayer at the Al Noor Mosque and were moments from entering the building when the incident began. The players then fled on foot to Hagley Oval. Two days later, Canterbury withdrew from their match against Wellington in the Plunket Shield cricket tournament. Likewise, the Super Rugby match between the Crusaders, based in Christchurch, and Highlanders, based in Dunedin, due to be played the next day, was cancelled as "a mark of respect for the events". After the attacks, there were renewed calls to rename the Crusaders team, since its name derives from the medieval Crusades against Muslims.

Canadian rock singer-songwriter Bryan Adams and American thrash metal band Slayer both cancelled their concerts that were scheduled to be held in Christchurch on 17 March, two days after the shootings. The Polynesian cultural festival Polyfest was cancelled after the shootings, with security concerns cited as the reason.
The music and cultural festival WOMAD went ahead in New Plymouth despite the attacks, with armed police stationed around the festival perimeter, inside the event, and outside artists' hotels.

Mosques around world became the focus of vigils, messages, and floral tributes. The mayor of Christchurch, Lianne Dalziel, encouraged people to lay flowers outside the city's Botanic Gardens. As a mark of sympathy and solidarity, school pupils and other groups performed haka and waiata to honour those killed in the attacks. Street gangs including the Mongrel Mob, Black Power, and the King Cobras sent members to mosques around the country to help protect them during prayer time.

One week after the attacks, an open-air Friday prayer service was held in Hagley Park. Broadcast nationally on radio and television, it was attended by 20,000 people, including Ardern, who said, "New Zealand mourns with you. We are one." The imam of the Al Noor Mosque thanked New Zealanders for their support and added, "We are broken-hearted but we are not broken."
A national remembrance service was held on 29 March, a fortnight after the attacks.

Operation Whakahaumanu 
Shortly after the attack, New Zealand Police launched Operation Whakahaumanu. The operation was designed to reassure New Zealanders after the attack and to also investigate possible threats who shared a similar ideology to the gunman. Police increased visibility in streets and visited many schools, businesses, and religious places as part of the operation. In Canterbury alone, there were almost 600 people of interest to police, where hundreds of properties were searched. On 14 July 2020, the Independent Police Conduct Authority deemed three of these searches to be unlawful.

Fundraisers and philanthropy 

Counting other fundraisers, a combined total of $8.4 million had been raised for the victims and their families ( Prime Minister Ardern reiterated that those injured or killed in the shootings and their immediate families are covered by the country's accident-compensation scheme, ACC, which offers compensation for lost income and a $10,000 funeral grant, among other benefits.

In late June, it was reported that the Jewish Federation of Greater Pittsburgh had raised more than NZ$967,500 (US$650,000) through its New Zealand Islamophobia Attack Fund for the victims of the Christchurch mosque shootings. This amount included $60,000 raised by Tree of Life – Or L'Simcha Congregation. These funds will be donated to the Christchurch Foundation, a registered charity which has been receiving money to support victims of the Christchurch shootings. This philanthropy was inspired by local Muslim support for the Pittsburgh Jewish community following the Pittsburgh synagogue shooting in late October 2018.

Related arrests and incidents

New Zealand 
Police arrested four people on 15 March in relation to the attacks, including a woman and a man, after finding a firearm in a vehicle in which they were travelling together. The woman was released uncharged, but the man was held in custody and was charged with a firearms offence. Additionally, a 30-year-old man said he was arrested when he arrived at Papanui High School to pick up his 13-year-old brother-in-law. He was in camouflage clothing, which he said he habitually wore. He is seeking compensation for a wrongful arrest. The actions were defended by police, who mentioned the threat level after the massacre and that they had to deal with reports possibly related to the attacks.

On 4 March 2020, a 19-year-old Christchurch man was arrested for allegedly making a terror threat against the Al Noor Mosque on encrypted social media platform Telegram. Media reports subsequently identified the man as Sam Brittenden, a member of the white supremacist group Action Zealandia.

On 4 March 2021, a 27-year-old man was charged with "threatening to kill" after making an online threat against both the Linwood Islamic Centre and the Al Noor Mosque on 4chan. The suspect was granted name suppression and remanded into custody until 19 March.

Outside New Zealand 
On 18 March 2019, the Australian Federal Police conducted raids on the homes of Tarrant's sister and mother near Coffs Harbour and Maclean in New South Wales. Police said the raids were carried out to assist New Zealand Police with their investigations into the shootings, adding that Tarrant's sister and mother were assisting the investigation.

On 19 March 2019, an Australian man who had posted on social media praising the shootings was indicted on one count of aggravated possession of a firearm without a licence and four counts of using or possessing a prohibited weapon. He was released on bail on the condition that he stay offline.

A 24-year-old man from Oldham, Greater Manchester, United Kingdom, was arrested on 16 March for sending Facebook posts in support of the shootings.

On 20 March, an employee for Transguard, a company based in the United Arab Emirates, was fired by his company and deported for making comments supporting the shootings.

Thomas Bolin, a 22-year-old living in New York, sent Facebook messages praising the shootings and discussing a desire to carry out a similar act in the United States with his cousin. Bolin was later convicted of lying to the FBI for claiming he did not possess any firearms.

Inspired incidents 
Nine days after the attack, a mosque in Escondido, California, was set on fire. Police found graffiti on the mosque's driveway that referenced the shootings, leading them to investigate the fire as a terrorist attack.

According to Sri Lankan State Defence Minister Ruwan Wijewardene, an early inquiry indicated that the 2019 Sri Lanka Easter bombings on 21 April were retaliation for the Christchurch attack. Some analysts believe the attacks were planned before the Christchurch attack,
and any linkage was questioned by New Zealand's government—with Prime Minister Ardern saying she was not aware of any intelligence linking the two.

A mass shooting later took place at a synagogue in Poway, California on 27 April 2019, killing one person and injuring three others. The neo-Nazi perpetrator of the shooting, John T. Earnest, also claimed responsibility for the fire and praised the Christchurch shootings in a manifesto. He and Tarrant were said to have been radicalised on 8chan's /pol/ discussion board. He also unsuccessfully attempted to live stream his shooting on Facebook.

On 3 August 2019, a shooter killed 23 people and injured 23 others in a mass shooting at a Walmart in El Paso, Texas. In a manifesto posted to 8chan's /pol/ board, the suspect expressed support for and inspiration from the Christchurch shootings. Additionally, the alleged shooter described himself as an "eco-fascist".

On 10 August 2019, Philip Manshaus opened fire at a mosque in Bærum, Norway, and livestreamed it on Facebook. He referred to Tarrant as a saint online and posted an image depicting Tarrant, Crusius, and Earnest as "heroes". The attack resulted in one injury. Manshaus was sentenced to 21 years for the attack and for killing his teenage stepsister, who was found dead shortly after the attack.

On 27 January 2021, the Singaporean Internal Security Department reported it had arrested a 16-year-old Protestant Indian youth under the Internal Security Act for plotting to attack the Assyafaah and Yusof Ishak Mosques on the anniversary of the shootings. The youth had produced a manifesto that described Tarrant as a "saint" and praised the shootings as the "justifiable killing of Muslims". Unable to obtain firearms and explosives due to Singapore's strict gun control laws, the youth had instead purchased a machete and vest.

On 14 May 2022, white supremacist shooter Payton Gendron killed 10 people at a Tops Friendly Markets grocery store in Buffalo, New York. He livestreamed the attack on Twitch and published a manifesto stating that he was inspired by Tarrant and others including Crusius and Earnest respectively. In response, Acting Chief Censor Rupert Ablett-Hampson placed an interim ban on the circulation of Gendron's manifesto within New Zealand. In addition, the Department of Internal Affairs considered referring Gendron's livestream of the shooting to the Office of Film and Literature Classification.

Reactions

World leaders 
Queen Elizabeth II, New Zealand's head of state, said she was "deeply saddened" by the attacks. Other politicians and world leaders also condemned the attacks, with some attributing them to rising Islamophobia. The prime minister of Pakistan, Imran Khan, announced that the Pakistani emigrant who charged at Tarrant and died, would be posthumously honoured with a national award for his courage.

The president of Turkey, Recep Tayyip Erdoğan, showed footage taken by Tarrant to his supporters at campaign rallies for  local elections. The New Zealand and Australian governments, as well as Turkey's main opposition party, criticised his actions. President Donald Trump condemned the "horrible massacre". When asked after the attacks if he thought white nationalists were a growing threat around the world, Trump replied, "I don't really. I think it's a small group of people that have very, very serious problems. It's certainly a terrible thing."

Far-right 
Two New Zealand-based anti-immigration groups, the Dominion Movement and the New Zealand National Front, quickly condemned the attacks, distanced themselves from the perpetrator, and shut their websites down. Some in the broader far-right culture celebrated the attacks and "sanctified" Tarrant as a central figure. Tarrant's manifesto was translated and distributed in more than a dozen different languages with a number of supporters on 8chan making photo and video edits of the shooting. Some extremists were inspired by Tarrant, committing violent incidents and deadly attacks of their own, such as those in Poway, El Paso, and Bærum. The United Kingdom's domestic intelligence service, MI5, launched an inquiry into Tarrant's possible links to the British far-right.

Islamic groups 
Ahmed Bhamji, chair of the largest mosque in New Zealand, spoke at a rally on 23 March in front of one thousand people. He claimed that Mossad, the Israeli foreign intelligence agency, was behind the attack. The claim has been widely described as an unfounded, antisemitic conspiracy theory. The chairman of the Federation of Islamic Associations of New Zealand said that Bhamji's statement did not represent other New Zealand Muslims, but Bhamji defended his statements.

The attack was also condemned by the Secretary General of the Muslim Council of Britain, Harun Khan, describing it as "the most deadly Islamophobic terrorist attack" observed recently. The Council on American-Islamic Relations (CAIR) called on Donald Trump, then U.S. president, to condemn the shootings. Speaking to reporters in Washington, D.C. Nihad Award, executive director of CAIR said: "You should condemn this, not only as a hate crime but as a white supremacist terrorist attack."

People and countries mentioned by Tarrant 
Just before carrying out the attacks, Tarrant asked his audience to subscribe to YouTuber PewDiePie's channel in light of his then-ongoing rivalry with Indian channel T-Series. Kjellberg has been accused of using far-right content in his videos. Kjellberg tweeted his condolences in reaction, saying he "felt absolutely sickened" to be mentioned by Tarrant. Kjellberg later called for the "subscribe to PewDiePie" movement to be discontinued, citing the attacks; "to have my name associated with something so unspeakably vile has affected me in more ways than I've let show."

During the attacks, Tarrant played the song "Fire" by The Crazy World of Arthur Brown. In a Facebook post, singer Arthur Brown expressed "horror and sadness" at the use of his song during the attacks, and cancelled a planned instore appearance at Waterloo Records shortly after the shootings out of respect for the victims.

In China, internet users expressed outrage and anger at the shooter praising their country's government.

Video distribution
Copies of the live-streamed video were reposted on many platforms and file-sharing websites, including Facebook, LiveLeak, and YouTube. Police, Muslim advocacy groups, and government agencies urged anyone who found the footage to take it down or report it. The New Zealand Office of Film and Literature Classification quickly classified the video as "objectionable", making it a criminal offence in the country to distribute, copy, or exhibit the video, with potential penalties of up to 14 years' imprisonment for an individual, or up to $100,000 in fines for a corporation.

Stuart Bender of Curtin University in Perth noted that the use of live video as an integral part of the attacks "makes [them] a form of 'performance crime' where the act of video recording and/or streaming the violence by the perpetrator is a central component of the violence itself, rather than being incidental."

Arrests and prosecutions 
At least eight people in New Zealand have been arrested for possessing or sharing the video or manifesto; most of their names have been suppressed either to prevent threats against them or in support of freedom of expression online. The first was an 18-year-old man who was arrested and charged with inciting racial disharmony under the Human Rights Act on the same day as the shooting. Early news media reports identified him as an accomplice to the shooting, but the police have denied this.

On 20 March 2019, Philip Arps was indicted for sharing the video under the Films, Videos, and Publications Classification Act 1993, he subsequently pleaded guilty to the charges. In June 2019, he was sentenced to 21 months' imprisonment and was released in January 2020, under the condition of him wearing a GPS electronic monitor. Arps had also expressed neo-Nazi views and sent letters advocating violence against New Zealand politicians. On 26 February 2020, another Christchurch man was jailed for nearly two years for doctoring footage of the shootings upon Arps' request, two days after the attacks.

Media outlets 
Several media organisations in Australia and tabloid-news websites in the UK broadcast parts of the video, up to the point Tarrant entered the building, despite pleas from the New Zealand Police not to show it. Sky Television New Zealand temporarily stopped its syndication of Sky News Australia after that network showed the footage, and said it was working with Sky News Australia to prevent further displays of the video. At least three Internet service providers in New Zealand blocked access to 8chan and other sites related to the attacks; and they temporarily blocked other sites hosting the video such as 4chan, LiveLeak, and Mega until they comply with requests to take down copies of the video. The administrator of the online message board Kiwi Farms refused a New Zealand Police request for the data of users who made posts related to Tarrant and the attack.

Social media companies 
Social media sites including Facebook, YouTube, Reddit, and Twitter said they were working to remove the video from their platforms, and would also remove content posted in support of the attacks. According to Facebook, no complaints were made about the video until 12 minutes after the live-stream ended; the original video from Tarrant himself had been viewed fewer than 200 times before Facebook was notified of its content, and it had been viewed only 4,000 times before it was removed, which happened within minutes of notification. Facebook created a digital hash fingerprint to detect further uploads after the video had been propagated on other sites. The company said it had blocked 1.5 million uploads of the video. Reddit banned "subreddits" named "WatchPeopleDie" and "Gore" for glorifying the attacks. Microsoft proposed the establishment of industry-wide standards that would flag such content quickly, and a joint project to manage and control the spread of such information via social media.

Despite the networks' attempts to self-police, New Zealand officials and other world leaders have asked them to take responsibility for extremist content posted on their services. Australia introduced legislation that would fine content providers and potentially imprison their executives if they do not remove violent imagery of these types of attacks. The French Council of the Muslim Faith filed a lawsuit against Facebook and YouTube, accusing the companies of "broadcasting a message with violent content abetting terrorism, or of a nature likely to seriously violate human dignity and liable to be seen by a minor". Facebook has contested the lawsuit, saying, "Acts of terror and hate speech have no place on Facebook, and our thoughts are with the families of the victims and the entire community affected by this tragedy. We have taken many steps to remove this video from our platform, we are cooperating with the authorities".

On 15 May 2019, Ardern and French President Emmanuel Macron co-hosted the Christchurch Call summit in Paris, which called for major technology companies to step up their efforts to combat violent extremism. The initiative had 53 state signatories and eight large tech companies.

Legacy

Gun laws 

Gun laws in New Zealand came under scrutiny in the aftermath, specifically the legality of military-style semi-automatic rifles. In 2018, for example, it was reported that of the estimated 1.5 million firearms in New Zealand, 15,000 were registered military style semi-automatic weapons as well as perhaps 50,000 and 170,000 unregistered A-Category semi-automatics. As Philip Alpers of GunPolicy.org noted, "New Zealand is almost alone with the United States in not registering 96 percent of its firearms ... one can assume that the ease of obtaining these firearms may have been a factor in his decision to commit the crime in Christchurch." Cabinet remains undecided on the creation of a register.

On the day of the attack, Ardern announced that gun laws would change. Attorney-General David Parker was later quoted as saying that the government would ban semi-automatic guns but subsequently backtracked, saying the government had not yet committed to anything and that regulations around semi-automatic weapons was "one of the issues" the government would consider. On 21 March, Ardern announced a ban on semi-automatic weapons. As an interim measure, the government reclassified some semi-automatic rifles and shotguns, requiring police approval to buy them.

The Arms (Prohibited Firearms, Magazines, and Parts) Amendment Act 2019 was introduced in the House of Representatives on 1 April and passed its first reading the following day. The final reading was passed on 10 April, supported by all parties in Parliament except ACT, and it became law by the end of the week. All legally obtained semiautomatic and military-grade firearms and their relevant ammunition were able to be handed over to police in a buy-back scheme. The scheme was initiated in July and lasted six months. Provisional data from police show that as of 21 December 2019 a total of 33,619 hand-ins had been completed, 56,250 firearms had been collected (51,342 as buy-back and 4,908 under amnesty), 2,717 firearms had been modified, and 194,245 parts had been collected (187,995 as buy-back and 6,250 under amnesty).

Police Minister Stuart Nash hailed the buy-back scheme as a success. In contrast, Nicole McKee, the spokeswoman of the Council of Licensed Firearms Owners, said that the buyback had been a failure and claimed that there are 170,000 prohibited guns in New Zealand, so "50,000 is not a number to boast about".

Royal commission of inquiry 
Cabinet agreed to hold an inquiry into the attacks, and announced on 25 March 2019 that it would take the form of a royal commission of inquiry. On 8 April 2019, Prime Minister Ardern announced that Supreme Court justice Sir William Young would chair the inquiry.

On 26 November 2020, the Royal Commission formally presented its 792-page report to the government. This report was made public on 8 December. Though it acknowledged there were no signs an attack in New Zealand was imminent at the time, it highlighted failures by the police system to properly vet gun purchases, as well as the country's intelligence services' strong focus on Islamic extremism at the expense of other potential threats such as white supremacy. The report also made 44 recommendations, including the establishment of a new national intelligence agency specialising in counterterrorism strategies. After the report's recommendations were made public, Ardern said the government agreed to implement all of them. The report also found that YouTube had radicalised Tarrant.

The inquiry was itself criticised by some Islamic community groups, such as the Islamic Women's Council, for not going far enough in its criticisms of government and police organisations, and the inquiry concluding that no organisation was at fault or had breached government standards.

He Whenua Taurikura
In line with one of the recommendations of the Royal Commission of Inquiry into the terrorist attack on Christchurch masjidain on 15 March 2019, the New Zealand Government held a hui (social gathering) called "He Whenua Taurikura, a country at peace" on 15–16 June 2021 to discuss countering terrorism and violent extremism. The hui was attended by several community, civil society, media, academic, private sector, and government leaders and representatives including Prime Minister Jacinda Ardern, New Zealand Security Intelligence Service (NZSIS) Director-General Rebecca Kitteridge, Police Commissioner Andrew Coster, Anjum Rahman of the Islamic Women's Council  and representatives from social media giants Facebook and Twitter, Amnesty International New Zealand, and the New Zealand Jewish Council. The hui's stated aims are "to develop options for the National Centre of Excellence, which will focus on generating research and public discussion to prevent and counter violent extremism, understand diversity and promote social cohesion."

On 15 June, several Muslim delegates chanted "Free Palestine" and staged a walk-out at the He Whenua Taurikura after NZ Jewish Council spokesperson Juliet Moses criticised Hezbollah and Hamas as terror organisations while discussing a pro-Hezbollah rally in Auckland in 2018. Muslim attendees including Haris Murtaza of the National Islamic Youth Association, the Federation of the Islamic Associations of New Zealand (FIANZ) chair Abdur Razzaq, and Azad Khan of the Foundation against Islamophobia and Racism criticised Moses for her alleged Islamophobia, perceived insensitivity to Muslim mosque shooting survivors, and for injecting the Israel-Palestine conflict into the conference proceedings. Moses later defended her remarks, denying that she was conflating Islam with terrorism but was seeking to raise the security concerns of the New Zealand Jewish community.

During the conference, Anjum Rahman of the Islamic Women's Council testified that her group had tried to warn the Government of a potential attack on Muslims in New Zealand. Some delegates including Aliya Danzeisen, Iman Bsivov, and Radiya Ali also related encounters of racism and discrimination. Danzeisen also criticised the insufficient presence of Muslim delegates among the panel. Victoria University of Wellington criminologist Dr Sara Salman and Auckland University of Technology communications lecturer Khairiah Rahman said that counter-terrorism needed to address economic security, structural injustice, racism, and discrimination. Prime Minister Ardern also addressed the conference via video conference. Activist and "Foundation Against Islamophobia and Racism" Valerie Morse also called on Twitter senior director Nick Pickles to take action against a neo-Nazi account.

Coroner's inquiry
On 21 October 2021, Chief Coroner Judge Deborah Marshall confirmed that she had opened an inquiry into the Christchurch mosque shootings at the recommendation of the families of the victims and other interested parties. In late October, Marshall confirmed that she plans to examine the initial response to the attacks by emergency services and whether any victims could have been saved if things had been done differently. The Judge confirmed that she was also seeking submissions from interested parties before the scope of the inquiry is finalised.

On 22 February, the coronial inquiry into the mosque shootings commenced. The inquiry was chaired by Coroner Brigitte Windle. The inquiry is expected to hear from lawyers representing the families of the victims, the Federation of Islamic Associations of New Zealand, the Islamic Women's Council, St John New Zealand, the Canterbury District Health Board, Police, and the Human Rights Commission. The entire coronial hearing was held via video conferencing due to the ongoing COVID-19 pandemic in New Zealand. Tarrant is scheduled to attend the hearing remotely from Auckland Prison and to make a submission through his lawyers.

On 22 February, survivors and relatives of the mosque shootings asked the Coroner to investigate allegations that police responding to the attacks had acted aggressively or confrontationally towards victims of the Al Noor mosque attack. They also asked the Coroner to investigate whether Tarrant was a lone wolf or had received help, and how he had obtained his firearms license. In addition, Anne Toohey, the counsel representing Zuhair Kamel, whose brother Kamel Darwish perished at the Al-Noor mosque, presented evidence challenging the Police's account that Darwish had immediately perished following Tarrant's attack on the mosque.

On 24 February, Tarrant's lawyer Rob Mansfield QC told the Coroner that his client was seeking an appeal of the earlier Royal Commission of Inquiry's hearings on the basis of factual errors in their report. Mansfield stated that Tarrant was questioned as part of the Inquiry  but was denied a transcript of his interview or a draft of the report's findings. Tarrant had only received a copy of the final report the previous week due to restrictions put in place by the Department of Corrections. Mansfield claimed that Tarrant had been denied "natural justice" and called upon the Coroner to reject the Royal Commission's report.

That same day, the Islamic Women's Council's national co-ordinator Aliya Danzeisen told the Coroner about the dangers of online "radical movements" operating on 4Chan and Telegram promoting hatred and violence against the Muslim community and undermining democracy and the rule of law in light of the 2022 Wellington protests.

Centre of Research Excellence
In line with the recommendations of the Royal Commission of Inquiry report into the Christchurch mosque shootings, the Government formally created the "Centre of Research Excellence for Preventing and Countering Violent Extremism" in early June 2022. The goal of the research centre was to fund research and academic scholarships into countering terrorism and extremism. Prime Minister Ardern also announced that sociologists Professors Joanna Kidman and Paul Spoonley would serve as the directors of the Centre for Research Excellence.

Film 
At least two films about the Christchurch mosque shootings have been proposed, Hello Brother and They are Us. Both films have attracted controversy and their future production timetable is uncertain.

In May 2019, Variety reported that the Egyptian writer and director Moez Masoud was developing a movie titled Hello Brother, based on the shootings. Masoud's proposed film project was criticised by the Muslim Association of Canterbury, Al Noor Masjid, and New Zealand filmmaker Jason Lei Howken for taking advantage of the tragedy and failing to consult the Christchurch Muslim community. In early August 2021, the New Zealand Herald reported that Masoud's film had been put on hold for unspecified reasons.

Glen Basner's FilmNation Entertainment began soliciting funding for They are Us in June 2021. The film was intended to focus on Ardern's response to the shootings, with the Australian actress Rose Byrne being cast as Ardern, while New Zealander Andrew Niccol was named as its writer. The filmmakers' choice to focus on Ardern's response rather than the victims attracted criticism. A spokesperson for the Prime Minister clarified that Ardern and the New Zealand government had no involvement with the film. Some also felt casting an Australian as Ardern was questionable; while this was not an emphasised issue it was seen as emblematic of the foreign, not local, desire to make the film. Several representatives of the New Zealand Muslim community also questioned the timing and appropriateness of the film. Due to this public backlash producer Philippa Campbell resigned in June 2021. A draft script was then leaked to Newshub in July 2021 and was heavily criticised by the politicians depicted and the families of victims. In response, the producers of They Are Us stated that the script is still in development and subject to change. Later that same month it was confirmed that production had been put on hold until the producers had undertaken a full consultation with the country's Muslim community.

Awards
On 6 July 2022, Governor-General Cindy Kiro awarded the New Zealand Cross to Linwood Mosque survivor Abdul Aziz and the late Dr Naeem Rashid for confronting Tarrant. In addition, Kiro awarded the New Zealand Bravery Decoration to Senior Constables Scott Carmody and Jim Manning for apprehending the terrorist; and Liam Beale and Wayne Maley for helping survivors of the Al Noor mosque. In addition, Lance Bradford, Mike Robinson and Mark Miller posthumously received the New Zealand Bravery Medal for helping victims of the mosque shootings.

See also

 Cave of the Patriarchs massacre
 Bayonne mosque shooting
 Far-right terrorism in Australia
 Halle synagogue shooting
 List of massacres in New Zealand
 List of Islamophobic incidents
 List of right-wing terrorist attacks
 List of terrorist incidents in March 2019
 List of rampage killers (religious, political, or ethnic crimes)

Notes

References

Further reading

External links 
 
 
 The last prayer: surviving Christchurch terror attack, a documentary about the mosque shootings by Turkish news channel TRT World
 Information on The Royal Commission of Inquiry into the Attack on Christchurch Mosques
 Christchurch terror attack: The day NZ changed forever, a documentary about the shootings by New Zealand media company RNZ

 
2019 crimes in New Zealand
2019 mass shootings in Oceania
2019 in Islam
2010s in Christchurch
21st century mass murder in Oceania
Mosque shootings
Deaths by firearm in New Zealand
Facebook criticisms and controversies
Far-right politics in New Zealand
Filmed killings
Islam in New Zealand
Islamophobia in New Zealand
Gun politics in New Zealand
Hate crimes
Livestreamed crimes
March 2019 crimes in Oceania
March 2019 events in New Zealand
Mass murder in New Zealand
Mass shootings in New Zealand
Massacres in 2019
Massacres in New Zealand
Massacres in religious buildings and structures
Massacres of Muslims
Mosque shootings
Neo-fascist terrorist incidents
Neo-Nazism in New Zealand
Persecution of Muslims
/pol/ phenomena
Spree shootings in New Zealand
Terrorist incidents in New Zealand in the 2010s
Terrorist incidents in Oceania in 2019
Violence against Muslims
White genocide conspiracy theory
2010s mass shootings in New Zealand